This is a list of episodes for Fast N' Loud Season 12. Season 12 started on January 16, 2017.

References 

2016 American television seasons
2017 American television seasons